The Church Center for the United Nations is a private building founded, owned, and operated by the United Methodist Church as an interfaith space housing the offices of various religions as well as several non-governmental organizations.  It is at 777 United Nations Plaza in New York City, across the street from, but not part of, the United Nations Headquarters complex.

The 12-story center is most known for its first-floor Chapel at the United Nations, which has a modernist design.  The chapel has long been a popular site for wedding ceremonies, especially ones between couples of different religious or national backgrounds.  Other events and conferences have been held at the chapel and in the church center as well.

History
The plan for the Church Center was first unveiled in November 1962 by the Methodist Church.
Construction began in the summer of 1962.  The building is located on the southwest corner of United Nations Plaza – a local bypass of First Avenue – and 44th Street.
The 12-story building was constructed at a cost of $3 million with the architect being the modernist William Lescaze.

The interior design of the chapel and church center was 
done by the noted American ecclesiastical architect Harold Eugene Wagoner.
  The paired stained glass interior and exterior sculpture on the street-facing wall were created by Henry Lee Willet and Benoît Gilsoul, respectively, with both working for Willet Hauser Architectural Glass. The name of this large work is "Man's Search for Peace" and it shows human-like shapes around a large eye-like form.  The chapel was sponsored with monies from the Women's Division of the Board of Missions of the Methodist Church; it is formally named the Tillman Chapel in honor of a prominent member of that division, Sadie Wilson Tillman.  Later a small statue by Moissaye Marans entitled "Prince of Peace" was added to the inside of the chapel.

The building was dedicated in September 1963, with UN Secretary General U Thant, US Ambassador to the UN Adlai E. Stevenson, and US Secretary of State Dean Rusk all speaking at the ceremony.  
In addition to the Methodists, representatives from the Roman Catholic and Jewish faiths were also part of the dedication. Some two thousand attendees heard U Thant praise both the UN and the church for the "act of faith" that led to its construction, while Rusk talked about how the dangers from the ongoing Cold War were ever-present.

Goals
From the beginning, the church center was considered interdenominational in spirit and purpose, and nonprofit groups representing various religions have been housed there. 
The church center was originally administered by the National Council of Churches.
Subsequently it was run by the Methodist Church itself, and then by the church's General Board of Church and Society. The different parts of the church involved in it became complicated, so to simplify it came to be that it was owned and operated solely by the United Methodist Women organization. In any case, as one United Methodist Women official said in 2013, "From its inception, the Church Center for the U.N. was envisioned as more than a site for the Methodist Church's international work. It was to provide access to the U.N. to other faith communities and nongovernmental organizations working for human rights, development and peace."

One of the goals of the center was to give both people of both lay and clergy vocations an immediate understanding of what went on at the United Nations.  To the end, conference rooms in the center have had a loudspeaker set-up wherein debates from the United Nations could be piped into them.  
The church center has hosted people pleading causes at the United Nations, such as  East Timorese independence activist José Ramos-Horta.  It is also the location where most of the nongovernmental meetings in conjunction with the United Nations Commission on the Status of Women are held.  Nonetheless, as the New York Times has written, "the affiliation between [the center] and the United Nations is more spiritual than official."

Events and uses

The Chapel is well known for being the site of marriage ceremonies, and especially for couples of different religious backgrounds and faiths.  By the mid-1970s, some 400 marriages a   year were being held there.  For a ceremony, there are banners representing various faiths that can be displayed on the chapel wall.  The chapel also attracts couples getting married from different nationalities, especially when they have met while one of them was stationed at the United Nations; in addition, people getting married for the second time, or who feel a kindred spirit with the purpose of the United Nations, also have chosen to be married there. Its use for interfaith ceremonies was mentioned in a 1985 Dear Abby column.  It has been listed for this purpose on the website of the Office of the Mayor of New York City. 

The church center charges a rental fee for use of the chapel for weddings.  People married at the chapel include then-US Senator Joe Biden (who would eventually become US President) and educator Jill Biden, in 1977. Receptions following the ceremony are sometimes held at the United Nations Plaza Hotel, located on the other side of 44th Street.

Other ceremonies also take place in the chapel.  The memorial service for prominent black academic Z. K. Matthews from South Africa was held at the Church Center in 1968.  A memorial service by the Japanese delegation to the United Nations was held at the chapel for American inventor William S. Halstead in 1987.

In addition, a variety of politically-oriented events and conferences have taken place at the center.
In 1965, the origins of an organization known as Clergy and Laymen Concerned About Vietnam (CALCAV), which involved Jesuit priest and anti-war activist Daniel Berrigan along with the Reverend Richard John Neuhaus and Rabbi Abraham Joshua Heschel, came from an anti-war rally at the church center. The Global Peace Service Conference was held at the Church Center in 1993.  Some events held there have been controversial, such as a hosting a panel discussion on religion with President of Iran Mahmoud Ahmadinejad in 2007, in which representatives of some religious groups refused to participate while others thought it important to engage.

A livestream of the play Sliver of a Full Moon,  a staged reading by survivors of domestic abuse on Native American tribal lands, was performed at the Chapel in 2014.

The church center has often been the site where announcements are made about the winner of the annual Templeton Prize for progress in thought about religion.

References

External links
 Official website of the Church Center
 United Methodist Women page about the Church Center
 American Guild of Organists page about the Chapel

Chapels in the United States
Headquarters of the United Nations
Turtle Bay, Manhattan
United Methodist Church
Interfaith marriage
1963 establishments in New York City
Office buildings completed in 1963